Ronald Scott (born July 21, 1960) is a Canadian former professional ice hockey goaltender. Scott played in the National Hockey League for the New York Rangers and the Los Angeles Kings.

Amateur career
Scott played for the Cornwall Royals in the Quebec Major Junior Hockey League, and also with Michigan State University in the NCAA.

Professional career
Scott began his professional career playing in the Central Hockey League with the Tulsa Oilers. He was member of the Oilers team that suspended operations on February 16, 1984, playing only road games for final six weeks of 1983–84 season. Despite this adversity, the team went on to win the league's championship. Scott went on to play 28 games in the NHL with the New York Rangers and Los Angeles Kings. He also played in the American Hockey League with the New Haven Nighthawks, and in the International Hockey League with the Colorado/Denver Rangers.

Awards and honours

References

External links
 

1960 births
Living people
Ice hockey people from Ontario
Los Angeles Kings players
Michigan State Spartans men's ice hockey players
New York Rangers players
Tulsa Oilers (1964–1984) players
Sportspeople from Guelph
Undrafted National Hockey League players
Canadian expatriate ice hockey players in the United States
Canadian ice hockey goaltenders
AHCA Division I men's ice hockey All-Americans